Godavari railway station (station code:GVN), is a railway station in Rajahmundry sub-urban. It falls in the Vijayawada railway division of the South Coast Railway of the Indian Railways.

Classification 
In terms of earnings and outward passengers handled, Godavari is categorized as a Non-Suburban Grade-5 (NSG-5) railway station. Based on the re–categorization of Indian Railway stations for the period of 2017–18 and 2022–23, an NSG–5 category station earns between – crore and handles  passengers.

Station amenities 

It is one of the 38 stations in the division to be equipped with Automatic Ticket Vending Machines (ATVMs).

References

External links 

Railway stations in East Godavari district
Vijayawada railway division
Buildings and structures in Rajahmundry
Transport in Rajahmundry